Aqueduct may refer to:

Structures 

Aqueduct (bridge), a bridge to convey water over an obstacle, such as a ravine or valley
Navigable aqueduct, or water bridge, a structure to carry navigable waterway canals over other rivers, valleys, railways or roads
Aqueduct (water supply), a watercourse constructed to convey water
Acequia, a community-operated watercourse used in Spain and former Spanish colonies in the Americas
Aryk, an artificial channel for redirecting water in Central Asia and other countries
Elan aqueduct carries water to Birmingham
Levada, an irrigation channel or aqueduct specific to the Portuguese island of Madeira
Puquios, underground water systems in Chile and Peru
Roman aqueduct, water supply systems constructed during the Roman Empire
Aqueduct of Segovia, a Roman aqueduct in Segovia, Spain

Anatomy
Cerebral aqueduct in the brain
Vestibular aqueduct in the inner ear

Places
Aqueduct, former name of Monolith, California, U.S.
Aqueduct, New York, U.S.

Other uses
Aqueduct (band), an indie pop band
Aqueduct (comics), a fictional character in Marvel Comics
Aqueduct Press, an American publisher
Aqueduct Racetrack, a horse racing track and racino, located in New York City
"Aqueduct", a song by Squarepusher from Just a Souvenir

See also

 List of aqueducts
Aqueduct Bridge (disambiguation)